Japanese-American singer-songwriter Utada Hikaru has recorded both Japanese and English songs for a total of 8 studio albums (5 Japanese, 3 English), 3 compilation albums and guest features in both other artist's singles and albums.

List of recorded songs

English songs

Notes

References

Hikaru Utada songs
Utada Hikaru
Utada Hikaru